Val-de-Bride is a commune in the Moselle department in Grand Est in north-eastern France. The commune was established in 1973 by the merger of the former communes Guénestroff and Kerprich-lès-Dieuze (German: Genesdorf and Kerprich bei Duß).

See also
 Communes of the Moselle department
 Parc naturel régional de Lorraine

References

External links
 

Valdebride